Quincy is a ghost town in the town of Quincy, Adams County, Wisconsin, United States. The community was flooded in the creation of Castle Rock Lake. It had a post office from March 1854 to June 1915.

References

Geography of Adams County, Wisconsin
Ghost towns in Wisconsin
Former populated places in Adams County, Wisconsin